Berstein Award may refer to:
Helen Bernstein Book Award for Excellence in Journalism, American literary award
Bernstein Prize, Israeli literary award